Colonel Kyaw Zaya (also spelt Kyaw Zay Ya) is a Burmese military officer who currently serving as Minister of Security and Border Affairs for Tanintharyi Region since 20 February 2017. He previously served as Acting Chief Minister of Tanintharyi Region after the arrested Chief Minister Lei Lei Maw with corruption case on 10 March 2019.He became a member of Tanintharyi Administration Council formed after 2021 coup and resumed military services on 1 August 2021.

Military and governmental career
Kyaw Zaya served as the tactical officer at Khamaukgyi Subtownship-based Operations (20) Administration Department after the appointed him as vice principal and the chief coach at the No. (12) military training school. Later, he was appointed as Minister of Security and Border Affairs for Tanintharyi Region which is member of Tanintharyi Region Government on 20 February 2017.

Acting Chief Minister
On 10 March 2019, following the arrested Chief Minister Lei Lei Maw with corruption case, Kyaw Zaya was appointed as acting Chief Minister of Tanintharyi Region, according to constitution laws.

On 11 March 2019, he succeed his position to Myint Maung, a Regional Minister of Natural Resources and Environment, as acting Chief Minister.

References

Living people
Year of birth missing (living people)
Burmese military personnel
Burmese soldiers
Government ministers of Myanmar
People from Tanintharyi Region